Tiakana Numanga (3 August 1909 – 1977) was a Cook Islands politician. He served as a member of the Legislative Assembly between 1965 and his death and held several ministerial portfolios, including being Deputy Premier.

Biography
Numanga was born in Titikaveka in 1909. He began work as a schoolteacher in 1927, later becoming a planter and running a bakery and store. In 1931 he married Meoroa, with whom he had two daughters and a son.

Numanga contested the 1965 elections as a Cook Islands Party candidate in the Takitumu constituency, and was elected to the Legislative Assembly. Following the elections, he was appointed to the Executive Council and became Minister for Public Works and Survey and Associate Minister of Labour. He swapped portfolios with Julian Dashwood, becoming Minister of Police and Social Development for a short period, before a cabinet reshuffle in January 1967 saw him appointed Minister for Health.

He was re-elected in 1968 and became Minister of Education. Following the 1972 elections he was appointed Minister of Fisheries and Police. After being re-elected again in 1974, he was dropped from the cabinet. However, after threatening to join the opposition, he was appointed Deputy Premier. 

In 1977, Numanga was awarded the Queen Elizabeth II Silver Jubilee Medal. He died in 1977.

References

1909 births
People from Rarotonga
Cook Island educators
Cook Island farmers
20th-century Cook Island businesspeople
Members of the Parliament of the Cook Islands
Education ministers of the Cook Islands
Health ministers of the Cook Islands
Deputy Prime Ministers of the Cook Islands
1977 deaths